The Liberal Initiative (IL) is a liberal political party in Portugal currently led by Rui Rocha.

It has 8 elected members of the parliament out of a total of 230 seats in the Portuguese Parliament.

The party was founded in December 2017, and in October 2019, its debut year at the Portuguese legislative elections, it won one seat in the Portuguese Parliament. It had run in its first elections in May 2019 for the European Parliament and in 2020 supported its first government coalition, at regional level, after the 2020 Azorean regional election.

The party espouses an economically liberal platform, including support for a lighter tax burden and a flat income tax, privatisation of state-owned companies, reduction of waste and overcapacity in the civil service, free trade and the liberalisation of the economy with increased labour market flexibility. However, it intends to preserve a welfare state to a certain extent. In other dimensions of life, the party favours views aligned with cultural and secular liberalism.

History 

Iniciativa Liberal is a socially, economically, and politically liberal party whose core tenents include support for an open society based on liberal democratic principles of the rule of law, property rights, individual liberty, freedom of speech, freedom of association, market freedom, democracy and a welfare state. It was created as an association in 2016, and was approved as a party by the Constitutional Court in 2017. It was admitted to the Alliance of Liberals and Democrats for Europe Party, a European political party, in November 2017, having run for election for the first time in the 2019 European Parliament election in Portugal, garnering 0.9% of the votes, and failing to win any seats in the European Parliament. In the 2019 legislative election, the party won a single seat in the Portuguese Parliament through the electoral district of Lisbon, earning 67,681 votes in total, equivalent to 1.3% of the votes cast. At regional level, IL supported its first government coalition after the 2020 Azorean regional election. In the 2021 Portuguese local elections, it won 26 seats in municipal assemblies, and none in municipal councils. In the 2022 legislative election, the Liberal Initiative party increased the number of its MPs from one to eight with 5.0% of the vote. Besides João Cotrim Figueiredo (already a MP at the Portuguese Parliament and incumbent party leader), IL elected seven new MPs for the party, including Carlos Guimarães Pinto (a former party leader), as MPs.

Ideology and platform 

The party has been described as adherent to the principles of liberalism, classical liberalism and economic liberalism. It has also been described as libertarian. It has been described as centre-right and right-wing, with its policy base described as combining economic liberalism with more progressive stances on cultural issues.

According to its own official statements about this topic, the Liberal Initiative was founded with the Oxford Manifesto in mind and believes in individual freedom, by which all individuals have fundamental rights, including the possibility of having a life of their own, owning property or choosing how they want to live in their community, closely following the principles of classical liberalism. The party's conception of freedom encompasses both the economic and social spheres as well as the political sphere and believes that if any of them are restricted, freedom ceases to exist. The party's political ideas are based on the idea of freedom as the greatest engine of human development, social harmony and economic prosperity. The party's leaders and founders have ascertained that they envisage Portugal as a country that will model itself on Germany's multi-payer health care system – which is paid for by a combination of public health insurance and private health insurance –, on Ireland's corporate tax policy and on Estonia's fiscal, educational, and public administration systems, following classical liberal economic policies.

On 5 May 2018, the Liberal Initiative approved its political programme under the slogan "Less State, More Freedom" (Menos Estado, Mais Liberdade). The party proposes the reduction of the number of civil servants and the extension of their health system to all Portuguese citizens, as well as extending the freedom for parents to choose their children's school without it necessarily being linked to their address.

The party rejects the political philosophy of libertarianism, arguing that while it defends a small government, it also defends an effective government which guarantees the rule of law, universal healthcare, universal education, social security and a welfare state. The party doesn't want to dismantle the Portuguese welfare state. It wants to rationalize it based on the principles of sustainability and equity by redefining its fairness proposition from the point of view of both social welfare beneficiaries/non-beneficiaries and taxpayers, regardless of age, current or previous occupation and other individual factors.

Platform for the 2019 legislative election 
Among the measures announced for the 2019 parliamentary elections were:
 Introducing a flat income tax rate of 15%.
This body is in charge of health care, and works like a health insurance, for the Portuguese civil servants only.
 Providing freedom of choice of school in both the state-owned and privately owned systems, through a school-voucher system.
 Granting more freedom for universities to define admission criteria, and following the American and British models for universities by adopting a student loan funding system.

Party factions 
The Liberal Initiative has a number of internal factions:

Classical liberalism 
It defends opposition to socialism through classical liberalism, calling for a low tax burden and promoting efficient, effective and accountable government, while defending respect for individual, social, political and economic freedoms.

Social liberalism 
This faction adheres to the principles of social liberalism.

Libertarianism 
The faction espouses an outright libertarian platform with neoliberal economic and political stances, whose proposals include support for a lower flat income tax, small government, unprecedented wave of privatisations and deeper economic liberalisation of the economy, including in the labour market, able to address modernisation and overstaffing issues in the civil service, productivity gaps and competitiveness problems of the country in the context of the European Union and globalization.

Liberal conservatism 
The faction supporting liberal conservatism, although being liberal on economic issues, is more conservative on social issues.

Organisation, communication and style 
The party is organised and managed in a decentralised, digitised way. It has no physical headquarters in most municipalities of the country and makes heavy use of information and communication technologies. Since its foundation, the party made an impact through the acclaimed originality of its communication and marketing campaigns, in particular its eye-catching billboards.

Electoral results

Assembly of the Republic
Vote share in the Portuguese legislative elections

European Parliament

Regional Assemblies

Local elections

Presidential elections

Assembly of the Republic

XV Legislature
2022-
 João Cotrim de Figueiredo
 Carlos Guimarães Pinto
 Carla Castro
 Rodrigo Saraiva
 Bernardo Blanco
 Rui Rocha
 Patrícia Gilvaz
 Joana Cordeiro

XIV Legislature 
2019-2022
 João Cotrim de Figueiredo

List of Presidents

References

External links 
 
 

 
2017 establishments in Portugal
Alliance of Liberals and Democrats for Europe Party member parties
Centre-right parties in Europe
Classical liberal parties
Economic liberalism
Liberal parties in Portugal
Libertarian parties
Political parties established in 2017
Political parties in Portugal
Right-libertarianism